Mariel Mencia (born 13 February 2001) is a Dominican Republic swimmer.

In 2019, she represented Dominican Republic at the 2019 World Aquatics Championships held in Gwangju, South Korea. She competed in the women's 50 metre freestyle and women's 100 metre freestyle events. In both events she did not advance to compete in the semi-finals.

References 

Living people
2001 births
Place of birth missing (living people)
Dominican Republic female swimmers
Dominican Republic female freestyle swimmers